CKS Zdrój Ciechocinek is a Polish football club based in Ciechocinek, Poland.

See also 

 Football in Poland

External links
 

Association football clubs established in 1922
1922 establishments in Poland
Aleksandrów County
Football clubs in Kuyavian-Pomeranian Voivodeship